Haiz may refer to:

Haiz (حيض ḥaiẓ), menstruation in Islam
Haiz (EP), a 2015 extended play by Hailee Steinfeld
El Haiz, a Roman castle at the Bahariya Oasis, Egypt